Semiempirical Energy Based (SEEB) is a partition method introduced by Carvalho and Melo to study protein ligand association processes. This method enables the stabilization energy decomposition both into physically meaningful and spatial components. As this formalism was developed at a semiempirical quantum level, it enables also the complete separability of these components. The SEEB formalism was extended to describe protein-ligand interactions using a pair-wise potential. The results obtained enable us to conclude that the present decomposition scheme can be used for understanding the cohesive phenomena in proteins. Computational methods are of great interest to evaluate binding affinities between proteins and ligands, with many applications in structure-based drug design.

SEEB Descriptors
The behaviour of SEEB descriptors was analysed with a MLR model. For this purpose a SEEB/MLR 3D-QSAR model was developed to evaluate the efficiency of benzamide trypsin inhibitors. The predictive capability of SEEB is shown to achieve state of the art QSAR performances.

References

Protein methods